Indirect presidential elections have taken place in Albania from 16 May 2022 to 4 June 2022. It was the ninth presidential election since 1991 and the collapse of the communist regime.

The first round was held on 16 May 2022, and failed due to all parties failing to agree on a candidate. The second and third rounds held on 23 and 30 May failed for the same reason.

Bajram Begaj, 26th Chief of General Staff of the Albanian Armed Forces, was elected president on the fourth round, with 95,12% of votes.

Background
The incumbent President of Albania, Ilir Meta, took office on 24 July 2017 and his term is due to end on 24 July 2022. Ilir Meta serves out his term in full until that date, the new presidential term will begin on 2022 and will be due to end on 24 July 2027. Meta will be eligible for re-election for a second and final five-year term in 2022.

On 10 May 2022, committee and party leaders met to decide on when Parliament will hold the first round of voting. This meeting marked the official beginning of the selection process, with the first round thus required within seven days. The constitution states that a presidential election must be held no more than 60 days and no less than 30 days before the expiration of the incumbent president's term.

Electoral system
The President of Albania is elected by a secret vote and without debate in the Parliament of Albania. A candidate needs to receive votes from three-fifths of the total number of parliamentarians to win. If the required majority is not reached in the first round of voting, a second round takes place within seven days. If a majority is still not reached, a third round must take place within a further period of seven days. If required, a further two rounds must be held within seven days, with the majority needed to win reduced to an absolute majority of 50% +1 votes of the total number of parliamentarian. In the fifth round, only the two top candidates from the fourth round are kept. If after five rounds of voting no candidate has attained the necessary majority outlined for each round of voting, Parliament will be dissolved and elections must be held within 45 days.

Official candidate

Announced
 Bajram Begaj

Results

See also
 Politics of Albania
 President of Albania

References

External links
President of Albania

Albania
2022
2022 in Albania
May 2022 events in Europe
June 2022 events in Europe